Dakoa Newman (born 6 June 1985) is a Ghanaian politician who is a member of the New Patriotic Party (NPP). She is the member of parliament for the Okaikwei South Constituency. She is the daughter of Victor Newman who was also a politician and founding member of the New Patriotic Party.

Early life and education 
She was born on 6 June 1985 into a Christian family and hails from Akropong and Osu respectively. She completed Wesley Girls Senior High School, Cape Coast. She is a chartered Project Management Professional (PMP)and a  chartered  Risk Management Professional (RMP) certified by the Project Management Institute, USA(2017. She also holds a Bachelor's Degree in Political Science from the University of Ghana, Legon and a Master’s Degree in Program and Project Management from the University of Warwick, United Kingdom.

Politics 
In June 2020, she stood for the New Patriotic Party seat for the Okaikwei South. Newman defeated incumbent member of parliament Arthur Ahmed and Nana Fredua by getting 440 votes, whilst the two others got 327 votes and 27 votes respectively.

She won the 2020 December parliamentary elections for the Okaikwei South Constituency. She was declared winner by getting 40,393 votes representing 60.82% against her closest contender Abraham Kotei Neequaye of the National Democratic Congress (NDC) who had 26,019 votes representing 39.18%.

Personal life 
She is the daughter of Ghanaian politician Victor Newman.

References 

Living people
New Patriotic Party politicians
People educated at Wesley Girls' Senior High School
University of Ghana alumni
Ghanaian MPs 2021–2025
1985 births
21st-century Ghanaian women politicians